Pyrazophos is an organic compound used as a fungicide and an insecticide.

Uses
Pyrazophos is a systemic fungicide which is used in orchards, vineyards and vegetable crops against powdery mildew. In some instances, the compound is also an effective insecticide (e.g. against leaf-miner flies).

History
The compound has been commercially available since 1970.

References

External links

Pyrazolopyrimidines
Fungicides
Insecticides
Ethyl esters
Organophosphates